Morissette is the debut studio album by Filipino singer Morissette and was released in the Philippines on March 20, 2015, by Star Music.

Promotion 
The album was launched on April 12, 2015, with a performance at Shangri-La Plaza.

Commercial performance 
On June 11, 2017, Morissette was awarded Gold and Platinum certifications by the Philippine Association of the Record Industry (PARI), denoting 15,000 album-equivalent units, during Morissette's 21st birthday performance on ASAP.

Singles 
"'Di Mapaliwanag" was the album's lead single, and was released on iTunes on February 25, 2015. For promotion, a lyric video was uploaded on YouTube on  February 27 of the same year. It became the official theme song of My Lovely Girl, an South Korean drama series which aired on SBS in 17 September 2014. The official music video, which is directed by Frank Lloyd Mamaril, was uploaded on Star Music’s official YouTube channel on June 14, 2015. Morissette performed "'Di Mapaliwanag" for the first time with Jed Madela on the variety show ASAP. "Throwback" with KZ Tandingan was the album's second single. The official lyric video was released on Star Music’s official YouTube channel on November 21, 2015.

Track listing

Release history

Certification

Notes

References

External links
Morissette's carrier single sums-up my love girl
Morissette launches debut album

2015 debut albums
Tagalog-language albums
Pop albums by Filipino artists